The discography of American hip hop recording artist DJ Paul, consists of eight studio albums, one extended play, five singles and 13 mixtapes.

Albums

Studio albums

Extended plays
Power, Pleasure & Painful Things (2019)

Mixtapes

Singles

As lead artist

Guest appearances

References

Discographies of American artists
Hip hop discographies